La lupa is a 1996 Italian drama film directed by Gabriele Lavia. It is based on the novella with the same name by Giovanni Verga.

Cast  
 Monica Guerritore: Gnà Pina "la lupa"
 Raoul Bova: Nanni Lasca
 Alessia Fugardi: Maricchia
 Michele Placido: Malerba
 Giancarlo Giannini: Father Angiolino

References

External links

1996 films
1996 drama films
Italian drama films
Films based on Italian novels
Films scored by Ennio Morricone
Films based on works by Giovanni Verga
Films directed by Gabriele Lavia
1990s Italian films